Ameri may refer to:

People
Goli Ameri (born 1956), an American diplomat and businesswoman
Haddaf Al Ameri (born 1992), known as Haddaf, an Emirati footballer
Jaber Al-Ameri (born 1986), a Saudi Arabian footballer 
Mirza Javad Khan Ameri (1891–1980), an Iranian politician
Noor Al-Ameri (born 1994), an Iraqi female competitive shooter
Zaid Al-Ameri (born 1997), an Emirati footballer

Places
 Ameri, Deylam, Bushehr Province, Iran
 Ameri, Tangestan, Bushehr Province, Iran

Other uses
 Āmeri House, a historic house in Kashan, Iran

See also

 Amari (disambiguation)
 American (disambiguation)
 Amri (disambiguation)